Harusame (Japanese 春雨 （はるさめ） "spring rain") may refer to:

Food
Harusame, Cellophane noodles (ja)

Ships

Arts
Harusame, painting by Kawai Gyokudō

Books
Harusame Monogatari by Ueda Akinari

Music
 Harusame, a traditional hauta (:ja:端唄（はうた）), a form of jiuta tune
 Harusame (ja) a  song by Kōzō Murashita